Sandrine Rudaz is a Swiss French film music composer based in California, USA. She was born in Switzerland, where she started her classical music education at the age of three.

In November 2019, she won a Hollywood Music in Media Award, was nominated for a Jerry Goldsmith Award, and was named personality of the month by the Swiss newspaper Le Nouvelliste. In 2020, she was named among the 100 personalities of the year by Le Temps.

References

External links 

 Official website
 

Year of birth missing (living people)
Living people
Swiss women composers
Swiss film score composers
Swiss people of French descent